William Tredway may refer to:
 William Tredway (American politician) (1807–1891), U.S. Representative from Virginia
 William Tredway (Canadian politician) (1833–1909), Canadian businessman and politician